Zob Ahan Esfahan Football Club (Bâšgâhé Futbâlé Zobâhané Esfahân) is an Iranian football club based in Fuladshahr, Iran. It competes in the Persian Gulf Pro League.
The team is sponsored by the Isfahan Steel Company, which also goes by the name Zob Ahan. The club's main rival is fellow Isfahani team Sepahan, which is also sponsored by the rival steel mill Mobarakeh Steel Company.

Zob Ahan club also has a basketball team, sponsored by the same Isfahan Steel Company, which is one of the teams in the Iranian Super League.

In the 2010 AFC Champions League. Zob Ahan finished as runners-up losing 3–1 to South Korean club Seongnam Ilhwa Chunma in the final.

Zob Ahan has won the Hazfi Cup on four occasions (2002–03, 2008–09, 2014–15 and 2015–16) and have finished as runners-up one time (2000–01). The club has also finished as League runners-up three times (2004–05, 2008–09 and 2009–10) and has won the Iranian Super Cup once (2016).

Club history

Early years (1969–1980)
Mohammad Ali Taghizadeh Farahmand established the club in 1969. They entered the Takht Jamshid Cup in 1973 and end season in the 10th place. They promoted to the quarterfinals of the Hazfi Cup in 1976. Their best results in Takht Jamshid Cup was earned in 1977–78 in the 8th place. Zob Ahan prepared its team by buying 14 players from their local rivals Sepahan.

Azadegan League (1980–2001)
The team has participated in the highest division of the Iranian league system since 1973, except for the 1995 season when they played in the 2nd division. After Iranian Revolution in 1979, Takht Jamshid Cup was suspended due to Iran–Iraq War. After the end of the war, league began again in the title of Azadegan League. They were once again promoted to the 1st division the year after.

PGPL (2001–present)
Zob Ahan currently play in the IPL starting from 2001. The club's first honor, remains the winning of the Hazfi Cup in 2003, after defeating the Shiraz-based team Moghavemat Sepasi in the finals. This feat was repeated in the 2008–09 Hazfi Cup, when the club beat Rah Ahan to re-claim the title after 6 years. The club made its first appearance in the AFC Champions League in 2004, as the winners of the 2003 Hazfi Cup, but were eliminated in the group stages.

Having missed out so narrowly on winning their first-ever domestic league title in the 2008–09 season, Zobahan were one of the title contenders once again in the 2009–10 season, never dropping out of the top-four positions throughout the season. However, at the end, they had to settle for second place once again
after finishing six points behind their city rivals Sepahan. They also lost their grip on the Hazfi Cup after a shock 0–2 loss to a second-division side Gostaresh Foulad in the semi-finals.

2010 AFC Champion League
In the 2010 AFC Champions League Zob Ahan finished first on the group stage that included FC Bunyodkor, Al-Wahda and Al-Ittihad. By finishing first they qualified for the first time for the Knockout stages. On the Round of 16 they draw country neighbours Mes Kerman winning 1–0. The club then qualified to the Quarter-finals and were drawn with title holders Pohang Steelers, Zob Ahan won 2–1 at home and draw 1–1 on Korea, knocking-out shockingly the title holders. Zob Ahan played against Saudi powerhouse Al Hilal which they won 1–0 at home, and won 1–0 on Saudi Arabia with a goal from Igor Castro leading the club to an historical Asian Champions League final where they face Seongnam Ilhwa Chunma. On 13 November, in the final Zob Ahan lost 1–3 to Seongnam Ilhwa Chunma. At half-time the score was 0–1 with a goal from Saša Ognenovski, in the second-half Zob Ahan conceded an early goal scored by Cho Byung-Kuk making the score 0–2, Zob Ahan finally scored the goal from Mohammad Reza Khalatbari making 1–2, but on the last minutes of the game Seongnam Ilhwa Chunma scored the 1–3 and killed the game. Zob Ahan couldn't be the champions on their 2nd Asian Champions League participation always being under-dogs, but they fought like warriors and made Iran proud. The following year the club made it to the quarter finals but lost to Korean club Suwon Samsung Bluewings.

Dark years
After the 2011 Champions League, Zob Ahan's golden age seemed all but over. A 6th place league finish in 2012 meant that the club failed to retain its spot in the Champions League. The following year, the club finished 14th in the league, narrowly avoiding relegation through a play-off. Fan attendance started to dip and Zob Ahan had another sub par year in the 2013–14 Iran Pro League season, finishing 13th, changing three managers during the course of the season and again narrowly avoiding relegation.

Resurrection under Golmohammadi and Hosseini

In summer of 2014 Zob Ahan announced Yahya Golmohammadi as the club's new manager. Golmohammadi introduced a possession based philosophy to Zob Ahan and after a poor start to the season, Golmohammadi's tactics and the addition of Kaveh Rezaei paid off and Zob Ahan when on a six match unbeaten run which placed them 6th in week 23. On 5 December 2015 Zob Ahan defeated Persepolis 2–1 in the Hazfi Cup semi-final to advance to the final for the fourth time in club history. On 15 May 2015 after a 0–0 draw against Padideh, Zob Ahan finished fourth and returned to the AFC Champions League after five years. Zob Ahan also won their third Hazfi Cup title after defeating Naft Tehran 3–1 in the final.

On 23 February 2016 Zob Ahan won its first match AFC Champions League since 2011, defeating Lekhwiya of Qatar 1–0. Zob Ahan qualified for the Round of 16 of the AFC Champions League on 20 April 2016 after defeating Saudi club Al Nassr 3–0 in match day 5. However, Zob Ahan were defeated 3–1 on aggregate by Emirati club Al Ain in the Round of 16. Zob Ahan once again qualified for the final of the 2016 Hazfi Cup to defend their crown against Esteghlal. Zob Ahan defeated Esteghlal in penalties and won the Hazfi Cup for the fourth time in the club's history. Zob Ahan won the Iranian Super Cup after beating Esteghlal Khuzestan 4–2 in extra time. This was the first trophy that Zob Ahan won in Foolad Shahr Stadium.

In the beginning of the 2016–17, after poor results, Golmohammadi was fired as manager of the team and was replaced by Assistant coach Mojtaba Hosseini. Hosseini led Zob Ahan to the semi finals of the Hazfi Cup, where they lost to Tractor in extra time.

Colours and crest
One of Zob Ahan's nicknames is Sabzpoushan ("The Greens"), stemming from their traditional kit, which is predominantly green. From the foundation of the club, the common home kit includes a green shirt, black or white shorts, and white or yellow socks. White and black colours are also seen in the kit. The away kit of the club is commonly with a white background.

Stadium and facilities

The home stadium of the club is Foolad Shahr Stadium located in Fooladshahr, Isfahan. The stadium had 20,000 capacity but was renovated to hold about 30,000 people in 2011. The stadium was built in 1998. There training stadium is located outside of Isfahan named Zob Ahan Private Stadium.

Rivalries

Zob Ahan is part of the Esfahan derby or Naghsh-e-Jahan derby, one of the biggest derby's in Iran. According to Iranian football journalist Afshin Afshar, the rivalry between Zob Ahan and Sepahan is one of the most important matches in the Iran Pro League.

The Esfahan derby goes back to the 1970s, when Zob Ahan and Sepahan faced each other in Takht Jamshid Cup seasons (1974/75, 1975/76, 1976/77, 1977/78). Their rivalry resumed in the 1990s when they faced each other in
Azadegan League seasons (1993/94, 1996/97, 1997/98) and from then on the two met each other twice a year.

Players

First-team squad

 U21 = Under 21 Player
 U23 = Under 23 Player
 U25 = Under 25 Player

For recent transfers, see List of Iranian football transfers summer 2022.

Retired numbers

On 18 June 2018, the club decided to retire the squad number 30 in memory of Mehdi Rajabzadeh.

Notable players
This list of former players includes those who received international caps while playing for the team, made significant contributions to the team in terms of appearances or goals while playing for the team, or who made significant contributions to the sport either before they played for the team, or after they left. It is clearly not yet complete and all inclusive, and additions and refinements will continue to be made over time.

Famous Players
For notable players see List of Zob Ahan F.C. players.
For details on former players see :Category:Zob Ahan Esfahan F.C. players.

Players on international cups

Club captains

Club officials

IPL managers

Only IPL matches are counted.

Last updated 10 August 2021.

Current coaching staff
Source:

Chairpersons

Season-by-season
For details on seasons, see List of Zob Ahan F.C. seasons

The table below chronicles the achievements of Zob Ahan since 1973.

{|class="wikitable"
|-bgcolor="#efefef"
!Season
! League
! Position
!Hazfi Cup
!ACL
! Notes
|-
|align=center|1973–74
| rowspan="6" align="center" |Takht Jamshid Cup
|align=center|10th
|align=center rowspan=2|Not held
|rowspan=17|did not qualify
|rowspan=5|
|-
|align=center|1974–75
|align=center|11th
|-
|align=center|1975–76
|align=center|9th
|align=center|1/8 Final
|-
|align=center|1976–77
|align=center|15th
|align=center|1/16 Final
|-
|align=center|1977–78
|align=center|8th
|align=center rowspan=5|Not held
|-
|align=center|1978–79
|align=center|N/A
|align=center|did not finish
|-
|align=center|1981–82
|align=center|Isfahan's 2nd Division
| style="text-align:center; background:#dfd;"|1st
|align=center|Promoted
|-
|align=center|1983–84
| rowspan="3" align="center" |Isfahan League
|align=center|3rd
|rowspan=4|
|-
|align=center|1984–85
|align=center|2nd
|-
|align=center|1991–92
|align=center|5th
|align=center|
|-
|align=center|1993–94
| rowspan="2" align="center" |Azadegan League
|align=center|4th
|align=center|1/8 Final
|-
|align=center|1994–95
| style="text-align:center; background:#fcc;" |8th
|align=center|1/16 Final
|align=center|Relegated
|-
|align=center|1995–96
|align=center|2nd Division
| style="text-align:center; background:#dfd;"|2nd
|align=center|1/8 Final
|align=center|Promoted
|-
|align=center|1996–97
| rowspan="5" align="center" |Azadegan League
|align=center|10th
|align=center|1/8 Final
|rowspan=19|
|-
|align=center|1997–98
|align=center bgcolor=bronze|3rd
|align=center|Not held
|-
|align=center|1998–99
|align=center|12th
|align=center|Third Round
|-
|align=center|1999–00
|align=center|5th
|align=center|First Round
|-
|align=center|2000–01
|align=center|4th
|align=center bgcolor=silver|Final
|-
|align=center|2001–02
| rowspan="21" align="center" |Iran Pro League
|align=center|6th
|align=center|Quarterfinal
|-
|align=center|2002–03
|align=center|8th
|align=center bgcolor=gold|Cup
|-
|align=center|2003–04
|align=center|4th
|align=center|Semi-Final
|align=center|First Round
|-
|align=center|2004–05
|align=center bgcolor=silver|2nd
|align=center|1/8 Final
|rowspan=5|did not qualify
|-
|align=center|2005–06
|align=center|6th
|align=center|1/8 Final
|-
|align=center|2006–07
|align=center|8th
|align=center|1/16 Final
|-
|align=center|2007–08
|align=center|6th
|align=center|1/8 Final
|-
|align=center|2008–09
|align=center bgcolor=silver|2nd
|align=center bgcolor=gold|Cup
|-
|align=center|2009–10
|align=center bgcolor=silver|2nd
|align=center|Semi-Final
|align=center bgcolor=silver|Runner-up
|-
|align=center|2010–11
|align=center bgcolor=bronze|3rd
|align=center|1/16 Final
|align=center|1/4 Final
|-
|align=center|2011–12
|align=center|6th
|align=center|1/8 Final
|align=center|Play-off
|-
|align=center|2012–13
|align=center|14th
|align=center|1/4 Final
|rowspan="3"|did not qualify
|-
|align=center|2013–14
|align=center|13th
|align=center|1/4 Final
|-
|align=center|2014–15
|align=center|4th
|align=center bgcolor=gold|Cup
|-
|align=center|2015–16
|align=center|6th
|align=center bgcolor=gold|Cup
|align=center|1/8 Final
|align=center bgcolor=gold|Super Cup
|-
|align=center|2016–17
|align=center|4th
|align=center|Semi-Final
|align=center|First Round
| rowspan="6" |
|-
|align=center|2017–18
|align=center bgcolor=silver|2nd
|align=center|1/16 Final
|align=center| 1/8 Final
|-
|align=center|2018–19
|align=center|6th
|align=center|1/16 Final
|align=center| 1/8 Final
|-
|align=center|2019–20
|align=center|12th
|align=center|1/16 Final
|did not qualify
|-
|align=center|2020–21
|align=center|14th
|align=center|1/16 Final
|did not qualify
|-
|align=center|2021–22
|align=center|7th
|align=center|1/16 Final
|did not qualify
|-
|}

Individual records

Lists of the players with the most caps and top goalscorers for the club, (players in bold signifies current Zob Ahan player). Mehdi Rajabzadeh is the club's all-time most capped player and top scorer with 93 goals in 296 games. This list includes goals from Iran Premier League.

Most appearances

Top Goalscorers

Top Scorers by season

Asian record

Asian Club Championship / AFC Champions League

Club honours

Domestic

1st Division/Persian Gulf Pro League
Runners-up (4): 2004–05, 2008–09, 2009–10, 2017–18

Hazfi Cup:
Winners (4): 2002–03, 2008–09, 2014–15, 2015–16
Runners-up (1): 2000–01

Super Cup
Winners (1): 2016

Continental

 AFC Champions League
 Runners-up (1): 2010

Ownership
The owner of the Zob Ahan FC is Isfahan Steel Company. Company is the first Iranian steel maker opened in late 1960, based close to the cities of Fooladshahr and Zarrinshahr, Isfahan Province.

Zob Ahan-e Esfahan and Iran's first car manufacturer, Iran National (renamed Iran Khodro after the Iranian revolution) were parts of a significant move from mainly agriculture-based economy toward industrialization by the pre-revolutionary government of Amir Abbas Hoveida.

References

External links

 Official website 
 Player statistics

 
Football clubs in Iran
Association football clubs established in 1969
1969 establishments in Iran
Sport in Isfahan Province